Perenchio is a surname. Notable people with the surname include:

Jerry Perenchio (1930–2017), American businessman and philanthropist
Stephanie Freid-Perenchio, American independent documentary photographer